Fuentes de Andalucía is a village located in the province of Seville, Spain. According to the 2012 census (INE), the village has a population of 7315 inhabitants.

In 2022, the village temporarily changed its name to Ukraine in response to a Russian invasion of the country. Numerous streets and locations were named after Ukrainian cities such as Kyiv, Odesa, Mariupol, Kharkiv, and Kherson.

The mayor of the village is Francisco Martínez, a member of the Nueva Izquierda Verde Andaluza party, which heads a left-wing green party coalition.

See also 

 Name of Ukraine

References

External links
Fuentes de Andalucía - Sistema de Información Multiterritorial de Andalucía

Municipalities of the Province of Seville

Reactions to the 2022 Russian invasion of Ukraine